Veli Bey is a name that occurs in Ottoman history:

Ottoman Beys (Lords)
 Veli Kelcyra Albanian nationalist
 Veli Saltikgil Turkish signatory in the Treaty of Kars
 Veli Bey Albanian feudal leader, father of Ali Pasha of Ioannina